Eurytides iphitas, the yellow kite swallowtail, is a species of butterfly in the family Papilionidae. It is endemic to Brazil.

References

External links
Butterflies of America types

iphitas
Endemic fauna of Brazil
Lepidoptera of Brazil
Fauna of the Amazon
Papilionidae of South America
Taxonomy articles created by Polbot
Butterflies described in 1821